Tensleep Creek is a stream that originates in the Cloud Peak Wilderness Area in the U.S. state of Wyoming. The stream is 7.95miles in length. Lakes that are along the river are Misty Moon, Lake Marion and Lake Helen.  Tensleep Creek is a tributary of the Nowood River which then flows into the Bighorn River.

Rivers of Wyoming
Tributaries of the Yellowstone River
Rivers of Big Horn County, Wyoming